The American former boxer Mike Tyson has four tattoos that have received significant attention. Three—portraits of tennis player Arthur Ashe, Marxist revolutionary Che Guevara, and Chinese communist leader Mao Zedong—are prison tattoos he received in the early 1990s, reflecting Tyson's respect for the three men. The fourth, a face tattoo influenced by the Māori style , was designed and inked by S. Victor Whitmill in 2003. Tyson associates it with the Māori being warriors and has called it his "warrior tattoo", a name that has also been used in the news media.

Tyson's face tattoo quickly proved iconic and has become strongly associated with him. Its Māori influence has been controversial, spurring claims of cultural appropriation. In 2011, Whitmill filed a copyright suit against Warner Bros. for using the design on the character Stu Price in The Hangover Part II. After initial comments by Judge Catherine D. Perry denying an injunction but affirming that tattoos are copyrightable (a matter which has never been fully resolved in the United States), Whitmill and Warner Bros. settled for undisclosed terms, without disruption to the release of the film. The legal action renewed claims of cultural appropriation but also saw some Māori  artists defend Whitmill. Legal scholars have highlighted how the case juxtaposes Maōri and Anglo-American attitudes on ownership of images.

Portraits of Ashe, Guevara, and Mao 

From 1992 to 1995, while in prison for the rape of Desiree Washington, Tyson read a large number of books, including works by Chinese communist leader Mao Zedong. Spike Lee sent Tyson a copy of tennis player Arthur Ashe's deathbed memoir, Days of Grace. Tyson was moved by the book and respected Ashe's ability to be nonconfrontational and admired his political views and his success as a black athlete in a white-dominated world. Tyson got prison tattoos of both men on his biceps: A portrait of Mao, captioned with "Mao" in all-caps, on the left; a portrait of Ashe beneath the words "Days of Grace" on the right. Gerald Early views the Mao and Ashe tattoos as together "symboliz[ing] both [Tyson's] newfound self-control and his revision of black cool", with Mao representing strength and authority.

Tyson chose tattoos of Mao and Marxist revolutionary Che Guevara to reflect his anger at society and the government while in prison. The Guevara tattoo, located on the left side of Tyson's abdomen, is derived from Alberto Korda's iconic Guerrillero Heroico photograph. In Tyson, Tyson brags that the tattoo predated the widespread commodification of Guevara's image. Tyson maintained positive views of both revolutionaries after leaving prison: In 1999 he described Guevara as "Someone who had so much but sacrificed it all for the benefit of other people." In 2006 he visited the Chairman Mao Memorial Hall and said that he "felt really insignificant" in the presence of Mao's body.

Face tattoo 

Tyson got his face tattoo from artist S. Victor Whitmill of Las Vegas, Nevada, shortly before Tyson's 2003 fight with Clifford Etienne, which would be his 50th and last victory. Tyson had originally wanted hearts, but, according to Tyson, Whitmill refused and worked for a few days on a new design. The design is not based on any specific . Tyson saw the tattoo as representing the Māori, whom he described as a "warrior tribe", and approved of the design, which consists of monochrome spiral shapes above and below his left eye. According to Tyson, it was his idea to use two curved figures rather than one.

The tattoo drew significant attention before the fight. Tyson took time off of training to get it, which trainer Jeff Fenech would later say was a contributing factor to the fight being rescheduled by a week. Experts including dermatologist Robert A. Weiss expressed concerns about Tyson boxing while the tattoo healed; Etienne said that he would not go after the tattoo. (Tyson ultimately knocked out Etienne in under a minute.) The work—which Tyson and others have referred to as his "warrior tattoo"—was also met with criticism from the outset by Māori activists who saw it as cultural appropriation. 

Rachael A. Carmen et al. in the Review of General Psychology posit that Tyson's face tattoo may be an example of "body ornamentation as a form of intimidation". Charlie Connell and Edmund Sullivan in Inked describe it as having become "instantly iconic". Its prominence has increased over time, aided by Tyson and the 2009 comedy The Hangover, in which Tyson appears as a fictionalized version of himself. The tattoo has become strongly associated with Tyson and has made his persona more distinctive.

The Hangover Part II copyright suit 
When Tyson got the face tattoo, he agreed in writing that all drawings, artwork, and photographs of it belonged to Whitmill. In The Hangover 2011 sequel, The Hangover Part II, the character Stu Price gets a face tattoo almost identical to Tyson's. After seeing a poster depicting the tattooed Stu, Whitmill sued Warner Bros. under the Copyright Act of 1976 on April 28, 2011, seeking to enjoin them from using the tattoo in the movie or its promotional materials. Describing the face tattoo as "one of the most distinctive tattoos in the nation", Whitmill did not challenge "Tyson's right to use or control his identity" but challenged Warner Bros.' use of the design itself, without having asked his permission or given him credit. Warner Bros. acknowledged that the tattoos were similar but denied that theirs was a copy, and furthermore argued that "tattoos on the skin are not copyrightable". The question of a tattoo's copyrightability had never been determined by the Supreme Court of the United States. Warner Bros. also said that, by allowing them to use his likeness and not objecting to the plot device in The Hangover Part II, Tyson had given them an implied license.

 
On May 24, 2011, Judge Catherine D. Perry denied Whitmill's request to enjoin the film's release, citing a potential $100 million in damages to Warner Bros. and disruption to related businesses. However, she found that Whitmill had "a strong likelihood of success" on his copyright claim and characterized most of Warner Bros.' arguments as "just silly", saying "Of course tattoos can be copyrighted. I don't think there is any reasonable dispute about that." She also described the tattoo used in the movie as "an exact copy" rather than a parody. On June 6, Warner Bros. told the court that, in the event the dispute was not resolved, it would alter the appearance of the tattoo in the movie's home release; on June 20 it announced a settlement with Whitmill under undisclosed terms.

Ngahuia Te Awekotuku, an expert on Māori tattoos, told The New Zealand Herald that "It is astounding that a Pākehā tattooist who inscribes an African American's flesh with what he considers to be a Māori design has the gall to claim ... that design as his intellectual property" and accused Whitmill of having "never consulted with Maōri" and having "stole[n] the design". Some  artists differed, seeing it not as appropriative of  but rather a hybrid of several tattoo styles; Rangi Kipa saw no Māori elements at all. The perspective of those like Te Awekotuku highlights the conflict between Māori conception of —which reflect a person's genealogy—as collective property and the Anglo-American view of copyright as belonging to a single person. While Warner Bros. initially said they would investigate whether the tattoo was a derivative of any Māori works, there was no further discussion of the matter prior to the case settling.

Notes

References

Citations

Sources
Book and journal sources

 
 
 
 
 
 
 
 
 
 

News coverage

 
 
 
 
 
 
 
 
 
 
 
 
 
 

Interviews and profiles

 
 
 
 

Other sources

 
 
 
 
 

Tattooing and law
Mike Tyson
Cultural appropriation
Tattoo designs
The Hangover (film series)